Ralph Habib (Paris, 29 June 1912 – Paris, 27 June 1969) was a French film director of Lebanese origin. He started his film career with Pathé. He later worked as assistant director notably Jean Dréville and Jean-Paul Le Chanois before directing his own films.

Filmography
1951 : Rue des Saussaies
1952 : La Forêt de l'adieu
1953 : Les Compagnes de la nuit
1954 : La Rage au corps (English title Tempest in the Flesh)
1954 : The Bed
1954 : Crainquebille
1955 : Men in White
1956 : La Loi des rues (English title Law of the Streets) 
1956 : Women's Club
1957 : Escapade
1959 : The Black Chapel based on the novel Die schwarze Kapelle by Olaf Herfeldt 
French title - R.P.Z. appelle Berlin 
German title - Geheimaktion schwarze Kapelle
Italian title - I sicari di Hitler
1960 : The Nabob Affair 
1966 : Le Solitaire passe à l'attaque
1967 : Hotel Clausewitz 

Joint film with Lee Robinson 
1958 : The Stowaway (English version) / Le Passager clandestin (French version)

Joint film with Gérard Sire
1967-1968 : Un taxi dans les nuages

External links

1912 births
1969 deaths
French people of Lebanese descent
Film directors from Paris